The Afghanistan national cricket team toured the Netherlands in 2009. They played two One Day Internationals and an Intercontinental Cup match against the Netherlands national cricket team. Afghanistan won the Intercontinental Cup match by 1 wicket, the country's first international first-class win. In the One Day International series, the Netherlands won the first ODI, while Afghanistan took the second, meaning the series was drawn 1–1.

Intercontinental Cup match

ODI series

1st ODI

2nd ODI

2009 in Afghan cricket
2009 in Dutch cricket
Afghan cricket tours of the Netherlands
International cricket competitions in 2009
Afghanistan 2009